Captain Obvious is part of an American expression demonstrating a lapalissade

It may also refer to:

Captain Obvious (advertising character), a fictional character in Hotels.com advertisements
Captain Obvious, a character on The Shebang, an Australian radio show
Captain Obvious, an episode of Mr Inbetween, an Australian TV show
Captain Obvious, a character in Annoying Orange, an American YouTube web series